These are lists of nuclear disasters and radioactive incidents.

Main lists 
 List of attacks on nuclear plants
 List of Chernobyl-related articles
 List of civilian nuclear accidents
 List of civilian radiation accidents
 List of crimes involving radioactive substances
 List of criticality accidents and incidents
 List of nuclear meltdown accidents
 List of milestone nuclear explosions
 List of military nuclear accidents
 List of orphan source incidents
 List of nuclear and radiation accidents and incidents
 List of nuclear and radiation accidents by death toll
 List of articles about the Three Mile Island accident

Lists by country 
 List of nuclear power accidents by country
 List of nuclear and radiation fatalities by country

Individual disasters, incidents and sites 

 2019 Radiation release during explosion and fire at Russian nuclear missile test site
 2017 Airborne radioactivity increase in Europe in autumn 2017
 2011 Fukushima Daiichi nuclear disaster
 2001 Instituto Oncologico Nacional radiotherapy accident
 1999 and 1997 Tokaimura nuclear accidents
 1996 San Juan de Dios radiotherapy accident
 1990 Clinic of Zaragoza radiotherapy accident
 1987 Goiânia accident 
 1986 Chernobyl disaster and Effects of the Chernobyl disaster
 1979 Church Rock uranium mill spill
 1979 Three Mile Island accident and Three Mile Island accident health effects
 1969 Lucens reactor
 1968 Thule B-52 crash
 1966 Palomares B-52 crash
 1964 SNAP 9a satellite releases plutonium over the planet earth, an estimated 6300GBq or 2100 person-Sv of radiation was released.
 1962 Thor missile launch failures during nuclear weapons testing at Johnston Atoll under Operation Fishbowl  
 1961 SL-1 nuclear meltdown
 1961 K-19 nuclear accident
 1959 SRE partial nuclear meltdown at Santa Susana Field Laboratory
 1958 Mailuu-Suu tailings dam failure
 1957 Kyshtym disaster
 1957 Windscale fire
 1957 Operation Plumbbob
 1954 Totskoye nuclear exercise
 1950 Desert Rock exercises
 Bikini Atoll
 Hanford Site
 Rocky Flats Plant, see also radioactive contamination from the Rocky Flats Plant
 Techa River
 Pollution of Lake Karachay
 1942 Leipzig L-IV experiment accident

See also 
 Nuclear fallout
 Nuclear and radiation accidents and incidents
 List of books about nuclear issues
 List of civilian nuclear ships
 List of films about nuclear issues
 Vulnerability of nuclear plants to attack
 United States military nuclear incident terminology
 International Nuclear Event Scale
 Atomic spies
 Nuclear terrorism
 Nuclear safety and security
 Nuclear accident
 Nuclear power phase-out
 List of hydroelectric power station failures
 List of industrial disasters
 List of environmental disasters

References

External links 
 Radiation exposures in accidents - Annex C of UNSCEAR 2008 Report (Comprehensive list of accidents with details)
 

Nuclear